Scott Price (born August 5, 1962) is a politician from the U.S. state of Nebraska.  A resident of Bellevue, Price served from 2009 to 2013 in the unicameral Nebraska Legislature. He was born at White Sands Missile Range in New Mexico.

State legislature
Price was elected in 2008 to represent the 3rd Nebraska legislative district. He sat on the Agriculture, General Affairs, and Government, Military and Veterans Affairs committees. Price resigned from the legislature on November 1, 2013.

References

 

1962 births
Living people
Republican Party Nebraska state senators
People from Bellevue, Nebraska